Nordenskjöld Ice Tongue is a broad glacier tongue extending eastward from the Mawson Glacier into the Ross Sea in Antarctica.

Discovered by the Discovery expedition (1901–04) and named for Otto Nordenskjöld. Although this feature is a glacier tongue, the generic term ice tongue is retained in the name to reduce ambiguity.

External links
 photo of the Nordenskjöld Ice Tongue

Ice tongues of Antarctica
Landforms of Victoria Land
Scott Coast